Zoe Claessens (born 28 April 2001) is a Swiss BMX cyclist. 

She started racing BMX aged seven. Her father founded the Echichens BMX Club in Switzerland, and two of her brothers were also BMX racers. In 2018 she received the Female Young Talent award from the Swiss Sports Aid Foundation. She was selected in the Swiss team for the  Cycling at the 2020 Summer Olympics – Women's BMX racing. Prior to that event in June 2021 she became the European Champion in Heusden-Zolder. She is coached by former World Champion and British Olympian Liam Phillips. 

In 2022 she won silver at the UCI BMX World Championships. In October 2022 she finished runner-up at the UCI BMX Supercross World Cup, behind Laura Smulders and ahead of Olympic champion Beth Shriever.

References

External links
 
 
 
 

2001 births
Living people
BMX riders
Swiss female cyclists
Olympic cyclists of Switzerland
Cyclists at the 2020 Summer Olympics
Cyclists at the 2018 Summer Youth Olympics